The National Defense Strategy (or NDS) is produced by the United States Office of the Secretary of Defense (OSD) and is signed by the United States Secretary of Defense as the United States Department of Defense's (DoD) capstone strategic guidance. The NDS translates and refines the National Security Strategy (NSS) (produced by the U.S. President's staff and signed by the President) into broad military guidance for military planning, military strategy, force posturing, force constructs, force modernization, etc. It is expected to be produced every four years and to be generally publicly available. 
 

 
 

The NDS informs another related document, the National Military Strategy (NMS), written by the Joint Chiefs of Staff and signed by its Chairman (CJCS). The NMS and NDS often agree, but since the CJCS's role is to give unfiltered military advice to the government, the NMS is also an opportunity for the CJCS to provide a contrary opinion, however rare. In any case, the NMS is a further refinement of the NDS to provide the U.S. military with more detailed guidance for theater campaign planning, modernization, force posturing, and force structure.

Moreover, the NMS is often classified, while the NDS is generally not. According to a fact sheet from the Department of Defense the March 2022 version is classified, however an "unclassified NDS will be forthcoming".

In 2018, the NDS became the sole successor to the Quadrennial Defense Review (QDR).

In 2022, the NDS was released on October 27 along with the Missile Defense Review (MDR) and Nuclear Posture Review (NPR).

See also
National Security Strategy (United States)

References and notes

External links

 National Defense Strategy, 2005
 National Defense Strategy, 2008
 National Defense Strategy, 2018
 National Defense Strategy, 2022: unclassified fact sheet

United States defense policymaking
Military strategy
United States Department of Defense publications